Cașinu may refer to one of two villages in Romania:

 Cașinu Mic, a village in Sânzieni Commune, Covasna County
 Cașinu Nou, a village in Plăieșii de Jos Commune, Harghita County